Douglas Anderson School of the Arts, commonly known as DA or DASOTA, is a magnet high school in the San Marco neighborhood of Jacksonville, Florida, United States. The school opened in 1922 as a primary school specifically for African American students. The school is named after a local civil rights activist, Douglas Anderson. In 1985, the school was renovated into a magnet high school specializing in performing, visual and language arts.

Awards 
Over the years, the school has accomplished many achievements including becoming a National Blue Ribbon School of Excellence and receiving awards from the United States Department of Education, International Network of Schools for the Advancement of Arts Education and the National Academy of Recording Arts and Sciences.  

In December 2009, the school became a Florida Heritage Landmark by the Bureau of Historical Preservation. The ceremony was attended by students and school officials, Anderson's family and the first graduates of the school from 1959.

History

Opened in 1922 as The South Jacksonville Grammar School for grades 1—9, the school was primarily attended by African American students; the only school in the region during that time. In 1945, the school name changed to Douglas Anderson School. During the 1950s, the school became a high school with the mascot of "Fiery Dragons" and in 1959, the school saw its first graduating class with a commencement speech given by Noah Marsh. During the 1960s, the school closed briefly and reopened in 1968 as a campus for Florida Junior College. In 1970, the school closed briefly again and reopened in 1971 as the Douglas Anderson Seventh Grade Center. In 1985, the school opened as Douglas Anderson School of the Arts.

Notable alumni

Wes Borland - guitarist   
Ben Harper - guitarist 
Patrick Heusinger - actor 
John Otto - drummer

References

Art schools in Florida
High schools in Jacksonville, Florida
Educational institutions established in 1985
Duval County Public Schools
Public high schools in Florida
1985 establishments in Florida